Heidi Urbahn de Jauregui (born 1940 in Remscheid) is an emeritus Professor of German Literature at the Jean Monnet University, France, and essayist.

Life
Heidi Urbahn de Jauregui comes from an entrepreneurial family in Remscheid.  After the basic studies (Philosophy, History, German) in Cologne, she moved to West Berlin.  A medical condition ended her studies. Following her recuperation, she could "fulfill her desire to leave Adenauer Germany, something she had wished to do for some time."

She continued her studies in French Literature and German studies in Paris and obtained her Licence (French academic grade) at the Faculté de Lettres of the University of Montpellier.

It was not possible for her to take the necessary Agrégation ( a required competitive exam in France) for a University teaching commission because the French authorities refused to naturalize her in spite of her fulfillment of the formal admission criteria.  The reason was that her research involved close contact with authors in East Germany. She went to the University of Lyon in order to finish a dissertation on the poet Peter Hacks and to attain a doctorate. She then received the naturalization and took the Agrégation.

After the tenure, an academic position would continually be refused to her.  In particular, no one accepted her argument that Peter Hacks was no East German dissident but a Utopian socialist with whom the East Germans did not entirely agree and support.  Finally, she received a position as Maître de conférences at the Jean Monnet University.

Today she lives in Montpellier together with her husband the Spanish Biochemist Juan Jáuregui-Adell, who researches in Montpillier at the CNRS.

Work
Heidi Urbahn de Jauregui works mainly on essays.  She has the reputation of a well known expert of Germans and in particular Literature of East Germany.  In her publications, she has never followed academic rules.  Her main interests are in the classics of German literature, in particular Goethe, Thomas Mann, Heinrich Heine and Bertolt Brecht.

She received the Heinrich Mann Prize of the Academy of Art in East Berlin in 1986.

Friendship with Peter Hacks
De Jauregui saw in the East German dramatist Peter Hacks the legitimate foundations of the German classics and the descendant of Goethe, Hegel and Heine.  She devoted her dissertation and many essays to his creative activity.  From 1975 on, she personally visited him regularly and maintained a continual correspondence until Hack's death in 2003.

Works on Heinrich Heine
A significant part of Heidi Urbahn de Jauregui's essays deal with Heinrich Heine's works.  She presented the first comprehensive biography of Elise Krinitz, who was the Heine's last mistress, at the end of 2007 called "die Mouche."

Publications 
Heidi Urbahn de Jauregui: Zwischen den Stühlen : der Dichter Peter Hacks. (Between the Chair: the Poet Peter Hacks) Eulenspiegel-Verlag, Berlin 2006, 
Heidi Urbahn de Jauregui: Charlotte und Goethe - a Monolog (German: Charlotte and Goethe - a Monologue) In: neue deutsche literatur (New German Literature) 3/1998, Nr. 46, pp 144–153 (Essay of Heidi Urbahn de Jauregui to a piece by Peter Hacks)

External links 
 Literature on and by Heidi Urbahn de Jauregui in the Catalog of the German National Library (German)
 Hacks-Encyclopedia (German) 
 Heidi Urbahn de Jauregui: Tocqueville - the Gentleman and the new Time (German)
 Heidi Urbahn de Jauregui: Peter Hacks and die Wende (German)

1940 births
Germanists
Living people
Heinrich Mann Prize winners
Academic staff of Jean Monnet University
German emigrants to France